Ricardo is the Spanish and Portuguese cognate of the name Richard. It derived from Proto-Germanic *rīks 'king, ruler' + *harduz 'hard, brave'. It may be a given name, or a surname.

People

Given name
Ricardo de Araújo Pereira, Portuguese comedian
Ricardo Arjona, Guatemalan singer
Ricardo Arona, Brazilian mixed martial artist
Ricardo Ávila, Panamanian footballer
Ricardo Bralo, Argentine long-distance runner
Ricardo Bueno Fernández, Spanish politician
Ricardo Busquets, Puerto Rican swimmer
Ricardo Cardeno, Colombian triathlete
Ricardo Carvalho, Portuguese footballer
Ricardo Cortez, American actor
Ricardo Darín, Argentine actor
Ricardo (footballer, born 1980), full name Ricardo da Silva, Cape Verdean-Portuguese footballer
Ricardo Faty, Senegalese footballer
Ricardo Fischer, Brazilian basketball player
Ricardo Fortaleza, Filipino-Australian boxer
Ricardo Fuller, Jamaican football (soccer) player
Ricardo A. "Rick" Galindo, American politician
Ricardo Gomes, Brazilian footballer
Ricardo González (golfer), Argentine golf player
Ricardo González (racing driver), Mexican racing driver
Ricardo Gónzalez Reinoso, Chilean footballer
Ricardo Gutierrez, American actor
Ricardo Hausmann, Venezuelan politician and professor at Harvard
Ricardo Hurtado, American actor
Ricardo Izecson dos Santos Leite, better known as Kaká, Brazilian footballer
Ricardo James, Panamaian footballer 
Ricardo Lagos, Chilean socialist politician and former president
Ricardo Larrivée, French-Canadian TV and radio food presenter and writer
Ricardo Lee, Filipino screenwriter, journalist, novelist, and playwright
Ricardo P. Lloyd, British actor
Ricardo Londoño (1949–2009), Columbian racing driver
Ricardo López Felipe, Spanish football goalkeeper
Ricardo Macarrón (1926–2004), Spanish painter
Ricardo Mangue Obama Nfubea, former Prime Minister of Equatorial Guinea
 Ricardo Marsh (born 1981), American basketball player, 2007 top scorer in the Israel Basketball Premier League
Ricardo Martínez, Mexican footballer
Ricardo Matosinhos, Portuguese hornplayer and pedagogue
Ricardo Maurício, Brazilian racing driver
Ricardo Montalbán (1920–2009), Mexican actor
Ricardo Medina, Jr., American actor
Ricardo Miranda, Canadian politician
Ricardo Mthembu (1970–2020), South African politician
Ricardo Nascimento, Portuguese footballer
Ricardo Palma, Peruvian author
Ricardo Pereira (actor), Portuguese actor, television presenter and fashion model
Ricardo (footballer, born 1976), full name Ricardo Alexandre Martins Soares Pereira, Portuguese football goalkeeper
Ricardo Pinto (disambiguation), multiple people
Ricardo Puno, Filipino lawyer
Ricardo Quaresma, Portuguese footballer
Ricardo Rodriguez (disambiguation), multiple people
Ricardo Rosset, Brazilian racing driver
Ricardo Salampessy, Indonesian footballer
Ricardo Sanabria, Paraguayan footballer
Ricardo Sánchez (water polo), Spanish water polo player
Ricardo Santos (disambiguation), multiple people
Ricardo Senn, Argentine cyclist
Ricardo Sperafico, Brazilian racing driver
Ricardo Teixeira (racing driver), Angolan racing driver
Ricardo Villagran, Argentine illustrator
Ricardo Villalobos, Chilean electronic musician
Ricardo Zonta, Brazilian racing driver
Ricardo Zunino, Argentine racing driver

Nickname
Richard Møller Nielsen, Danish football manager whose team won the Euro 1992

Last name
Amy Mary Ricardo, birth name of Amy Gordon-Lennox, Countess of March (1847–1879), British aristocrat
Cicely Kate Ricardo, birth name of Kate Bertram (1912–1999), British ichthyologist
David Ricardo (1772–1823), British economist
David Ricardo (the younger) (1803–1864), British Liberal Member of Parliament
Colonel Francis Cecil Ricardo (1852–1924), British army officer , police officer and philanthropist (brother of Horace Ricardo)
Halsey Ricardo (1854–1928), English architect and designer
Sir Harry Ricardo (1885–1974), British motor engineer who established Ricardo Consulting Engineers
Colonel Horace Ricardo (1850–1935), British army officer and land owner (brother of Francis Cecil Ricardo)
James Ricardo, American film director
John Lewis Ricardo (1812–1862), British businessman and politician
Osman Ricardo (1795–1881), British Liberal and Whig politician

Fictional characters
Richard Alpert (Lost), on the Lost TV series
Ricardo Diaz, from the Grand Theft Auto: Vice City video game
Lucy and Ricky Ricardo, main characters on the I Love Lucy TV series
Ricardo Dalisay, the primary protagonist in the Ang Probinsyano TV series
Ricardo Tubbs, on the TV series Miami Vice
Ricardo (comic book character), the main antagonist from The Adventures of Nero comic book series

See also
 Riccardo
 Daniel Ricciardo

Masculine given names
Portuguese masculine given names
Spanish masculine given names
Sephardic surnames
Surnames from given names